David Bertram Miller Smith (14 September 188429 July 1963) was an Australian sportsman.

Football career
His father was a champion Australian rules footballer for Carlton when Carlton was still in the Victorian Football Association (VFA) competition.

Although born in Richmond, Dave Smith played 142 games of Australian rules football in the Victorian Football League (VFL) with Essendon from 1903 to 1913, scoring 114 goals, captaining the Essendon team in its 1911 premiership year; his decision to go to Essendon (which, at the time, was playing its home games at the nearby Richmond) was because Richmond was a member of the VFA at the time.

He later played one match for Richmond in 1914, scoring three goals, and then retired.

Cricket career
He played district cricket with Richmond Cricket Club, captaining the team from 1910 to 1915, scoring 2404 runs, and winning the batting average in seasons 1908–09 and 1909–10. He played 46 first-class matches for Victoria and various Australian teams.

He toured New Zealand with the Australian side in 1909–10, and England with the Australians in 1912, where he played in two of the Test matches.

Having failed to appear at a disciplinary hearing of the Australian Cricket Board, conducted on the 1912 team's return to Australia to answer allegations that had been specifically levelled against him of indiscipline, drunken brawling, rudeness towards the English public, claiming illness, he never played another first-class match.

Footnotes

References
 Hogan P: The Tigers of Old, Richmond FC, (Melbourne), 1996. 
 Maplestone, M., Flying Higher: History of the Essendon Football Club 1872–1996, Essendon Football Club, (Melbourne), 1996. 
 Ross, J. (ed), 100 Years of Australian Football 1897–1996: The Complete Story of the AFL, All the Big Stories, All the Great Pictures, All the Champions, Every AFL Season Reported, Viking, (Ringwood), 1996.

External links

Brydon Coverdale, "Australia's Winter Allrounders: XI Test Cricketers who played Australian Rules football at the highest level", Cricinfo, 28 May 2007

1884 births
1963 deaths
Australia Test cricketers
Victoria cricketers
Richmond cricketers
Essendon Football Club players
Essendon Football Club Premiership players
Essendon Football Club coaches
Richmond Football Club players
People from Richmond, Victoria
Australian rules footballers from Melbourne
Australian cricketers
One-time VFL/AFL Premiership players
Cricketers from Melbourne